Fara is a 1999 Russian thriller drama film directed by Abay Karpykov. It was entered into the 21st Moscow International Film Festival where Farhat Abdraimov won the Silver St. George for Best Actor.

Plot
Fara is a good-natured fat man, the son of the murdered bank director. As a child, the boy was disabled, and only his sole friend Bob at the cost of his life helped to get the boy to his feet. Fara's father left him a legacy of millions on a secret account. Mafia's goal becomes to learn the code to it. Then a strange woman appears with a sick child whose life supposedly can only be saved by means of an immediate and very expensive operation.

Cast
 Farhat Abdraimov as Fara
 Christina Orbakaite  as stranger
 Aleksandr Aleksandrov
 Dauren Sarsekeyev
 Peter Zhmutski as hippie
 Maurizio Aschero as banker

References

External links
 

1999 films
1990s thriller drama films
Russian thriller drama films
1990s Russian-language films
Kazakhstani drama films